Thieves Holm is a small island in Orkney, Scotland.

Geography and geology
Thieves Holm is due north of Mainland, Orkney at the mouth of Kirkwall Bay, between the Mainland and the isle of Shapinsay. It is at the west end of the strait between Mainland and Shapinsay, known as the String. It is south west of the tidal island of Helliar Holm.

The name is said to derive from the practice of  banishing thieves and witches there. The island is uninhabited and home to a variety of wildlife including cormorants, kittiwakes and seals.

References

Uninhabited islands of Orkney